Federal elections were held in Germany on 16 June 1903. Despite the Social Democratic Party (SPD) receiving a clear plurality of votes, the Centre Party remained the largest party in the Reichstag after winning 100 of the 397 seats, whilst the SPD won only 81. Voter turnout was 76.1%.

Results

Alsace-Lorraine

References

Federal elections in Germany
1903 elections in Germany
Germany
Elections in the German Empire
June 1903 events